Abdul Hamid Makhkamov (born 11 February 1976) is an Uzbekistani former professional tennis player.

Makhkamov had best world rankings of 688 in singles and 345 in doubles. He featured in three editions of the President's Cup in Tashkent, including the singles main draw in 1997. As a doubles player he won one ITF Futures title and was runner-up at the 2001 Togliatti Challenger. He has served as non playing captain of the Uzbekistan Davis Cup team.

ATP Challenger/ITF Futures finals

Doubles: 5 (1–4)

References

External links
 
 

1976 births
Living people
Uzbekistani male tennis players
20th-century Uzbekistani people
21st-century Uzbekistani people